...you is the second studio album by German pop singer Sasha, released by Warner Music on 2 May 2000 in German-speaking Europe, chiefly produced by Grant Michael B. and Pomez di Lorenzo.

Following the Europe-wide breakthrough success of his debut album Dedicated to..., ...you charted noticeably lower in most international territories. It however manifested Sasha's success throughout German-speaking Europe where it reached higher peak positions than its predecessor on the album charts in Austria, Germany and Switzerland, and was eventually certified double gold by the IFPI. Altogether the album produced three singles, of which only lead single "Let Me Be the One" reached the top 20.

Track listing

Charts

Weekly charts

Year-end charts

Certifications

References 

2000 albums
Sasha (German singer) albums
Warner Music Group albums